Stanley is a neighborhood in Johnson County, Kansas which previously had the status of an unincorporated community before being absorbed by the larger Overland Park in 1985. It is part of the Kansas City metropolitan area.

References

Unincorporated communities in Johnson County, Kansas
Unincorporated communities in Kansas